The 2014 Tour of Alberta was the second edition of the Tour of Alberta stage race, a 2.1 race included on the UCI America Tour. As such, the race was only open to teams on the UCI Pro Tour, UCI Professional Continental and UCI Continental circuits. The race took place between September 2–7, 2014, as a six-day, six-stage race, traversing the province of Alberta. The race commenced in Calgary and finished in Edmonton.

Participating teams

Stages

Prologue

September 2, 2014 — Calgary to Calgary,

Stage 1

September 3, 2014 — Lethbridge to Lethbridge,

Stage 2
September 4, 2014 — Innisfail to Red Deer,

Stage 3

September 5, 2014 — Wetaskiwin to Edmonton,

Stage 4
September 6, 2014 — Edmonton to Strathcona County,

Stage 5
September 7, 2014 — Edmonton to Edmonton,

Classification leadership

Classification standings

General classification

Points classification

Mountains classification

Young rider classification

Team classification

References

External links

Tour of Alberta
Tour of Alberta
Tour of Alberta
2014 in Alberta